Werneth may refer to:
Werneth, Cheshire, England
Werneth, Greater Manchester, England; a district of Oldham
Werneth, Victoria, Australia